is a former Japanese football player.

Playing career
Takamoto was born in Miyazaki Prefecture on December 31, 1967. After graduating from Fukuoka University, he joined Toshiba in 1990. He played for the club in 2 seasons. In 1993, he moved to Nagoya Grampus Eight. In 1994, he moved to Japan Football League club Kyoto Purple Sanga. Although he played as mainly defender, he also played as forward. The club was promoted to J1 League in 1996. He retired end of 1996 season.

Club statistics

References

External links

kyotosangadc

1967 births
Living people
Fukuoka University alumni
Association football people from Miyazaki Prefecture
Japanese footballers
Japan Soccer League players
J1 League players
Japan Football League (1992–1998) players
Hokkaido Consadole Sapporo players
Nagoya Grampus players
Kyoto Sanga FC players
Association football defenders